Savin Gunasekara (born 15 July 1996) is a Sri Lankan cricketer. He made his List A debut for Sri Lanka Navy Sports Club in the 2017–18 Premier Limited Overs Tournament on 14 March 2018. He made his Twenty20 debut on 15 January 2020, for Burgher Recreation Club in the 2019–20 SLC Twenty20 Tournament.

References

External links
 

1996 births
Living people
Sri Lankan cricketers
Burgher Recreation Club cricketers
Sri Lanka Navy Sports Club cricketers
Place of birth missing (living people)